Albert Viger (19 October 1843 – 8 July 1926) was a French politician of the Third French Republic. He served three times as minister of agriculture in the governments of Alexandre Ribot, Charles Dupuy, Jean Casimir-Perier, Léon Bourgeois and Henri Brisson. He served in the Senate of France and was a member of the Legion of Honour.

References

Sources 
 

1843 births
1926 deaths
French Ministers of Agriculture
French Senators of the Third Republic
Chevaliers of the Légion d'honneur
Senators of Loiret